Somme is a department of France, located in the north of the country and named after the Somme river. It is part of the Hauts-de-France region. It had a population of 570,559 in 2019.

The north central area of the Somme was the site of a series of battles during World War I, including the particularly significant Battle of the Somme in 1916. As a result of this and other battles fought in the area, the department is home to many military cemeteries and several major monuments commemorating the many soldiers from various countries who died on its battlefields.  The 1346 Battle of Crécy, a major English victory early in the Hundred Years' War, also took place in this department.

Geography
The Somme department is in the current region of Hauts-de-France and is surrounded by the departments of Pas-de-Calais, Nord, Aisne, Oise and Seine-Maritime. In the northwest, it has a coast on the English Channel. The main rivers are the Somme and its tributaries (Avre, Ancre and Noye, the Authie) as well as the Bresle.

Principal towns

The most populous commune is Amiens, the prefecture. , there are 9 communes with more than 5,000 inhabitants:

Battles of the Somme

At the beginning of the First World War, during the Race to the Sea of September and November 1914, the Somme became the site of the Battle of Albert. The battle was a five-day engagement between 25 and 29 September, with the French Tenth Army attacking at Albert and pushing toward Bapaume, and the German Sixth Army counter-attacking back towards Albert. The line settled around the town of Thiepval and remained there until July 1916, when the Battle of the Somme was fought on and around the same ground.

The Battle of the Somme was one of the most costly battles of World War I, by the number of troop casualties, as Allied forces attempted to break through the German lines along a  front north and south of the River Somme. The Allies had originally intended the Somme to be the site of one of several simultaneous major offensives by Allied powers against the Central Powers in 1916. However, before these offensives could begin, the Germans attacked first, engaging the Allies at the Battle of Verdun. As this battle dragged on, the purpose of the Somme campaign (which was still in the planning stage) shifted from striking a decisive blow against Germany to drawing German forces away from Verdun and relieving the Allied forces there. By its end, the losses on the Somme had exceeded those at Verdun.

While Verdun would bite deep in the national consciousness of France for generations, the Somme would have the same effect on generations of Britons. The battle is best remembered for its first day, 1 July 1916, on which the British suffered 57,420 casualties, including 19,240 dead—the bloodiest day in the history of the British Army to this day. As terrible as the battle was for the British Empire troops who suffered there, it naturally affected the other nationalities as well. By the end of the battle, the British had learned many lessons in modern warfare, while the Germans had suffered irreplaceable losses. British historian Sir James Edmonds stated, "It is not too much to claim that the foundations of the final victory on the Western Front were laid by the Somme offensive of 1916".

For the first time, the home front in Britain was exposed to the horrors of modern war with the release of the propaganda film The Battle of the Somme, which used actual footage from the first days of the battle.

The Somme experienced war twice more in the First and Second Battles of the Somme of 1918.

Demographics 
Population development since 1801:

Politics 

The president of the departmental council is Stéphane Haussoulier, elected in July 2021.

Presidential elections 2nd round

Current National Assembly representatives

Tourism

Image gallery

See also 

 Cantons of the Somme department 
 Communes of the Somme department 
 Arrondissements of the Somme department

References

External links
  Prefecture of Somme website
  Departmental council's website
  Photos from Somme
 GPS-Teamproject "Verdun - Somme - 1916"

 
Departments of Hauts-de-France